Old Flames is an album by jazz saxophonist Sonny Rollins, released on the Milestone label in 1993, featuring performances by Rollins with Clifton Anderson, Tommy Flanagan, Bob Cranshaw and Jack DeJohnette with Jon Faddis, Byron Stripling,  Alex Brofsky and Bob Stewart added on two tracks which were arranged by Jimmy Heath.

Reception

The Allmusic review by Scott Yanow calls the album "Comfortable and occasionally passionate music by one of the classic tenor-saxophonists".

Track listing
All compositions by Sonny Rollins except as indicated
 "Darn That Dream" (Eddie DeLange, Jimmy Van Heusen) – 6:56
 "Where or When" (Lorenz Hart, Richard Rodgers) – 8:09
 "My Old Flame" (Sam Coslow, Arthur Johnston) – 7:15
 "Times Slimes" – 6:58
 "I See Your Face Before Me" (Howard Dietz, Arthur Schwartz) – 9:41
 "Delia" (Franz Lehár) – 9:48
 "Prelude to a Kiss" (Duke Ellington, Irving Gordon, Irving Mills) – 7:18
Recorded in NY on July–August, 1993

Personnel
Sonny Rollins - tenor saxophone
Clifton Anderson - trombone
Tommy Flanagan - piano
Bob Cranshaw - electric bass
Jack DeJohnette - drums
Jon Faddis, Byron Stripling - flugelhorn (tracks 1 & 7)
Alex Brofsky - French horn (tracks 1 & 7)
Bob Stewart - tuba (tracks 1 & 7)
Jimmy Heath - arranger, conductor (tracks 1 & 7)

References

1993 albums
Milestone Records albums
Sonny Rollins albums